Maurício Nogueira Barbieri (born 30 September 1981) is a Brazilian professional football coach, currently the head coach of Vasco da Gama.

Career

Early career
Born in São Paulo, Barbieri began his professional career at Pão de Açúcar in 2004, working with the youth setup. In 2010 he was promoted to the first team as an assistant coach.

On 20 September 2011, Barbieri was named head coach of Audax Rio, and managed to achieve promotion to the first division of the Campeonato Carioca in the following year, as runner-up. On 12 November 2013, he was announced at the helm of Red Bull Brasil.

After achieving promotion from Campeonato Paulista Série A2 and taking the club to their first national championship of their history, Barbieri renewed his contract for a further year on 21 September 2015. He left the club in the end of his contract.

Guarani
On 20 February 2017, Barbieri replaced departing Ney da Matta at Guarani. On 23 March, after just six matches in charge, he left the club.

Flamengo
Barbieri was subsequently in charge of Desportivo Brasil before leaving the club on 9 January 2018, after accepting an offer from Flamengo. Initially an assistant to Paulo César Carpegiani, he was appointed interim coach on 30 March 2018.

On 29 June 2018, after 19 matches in charge, Barbieri was definitely appointed as head coach until the end of the year. He was dismissed on 28 September, after being in charge of the club for 39 matches overall.

Goiás
Barbieri appointed head coach of newly promoted side Goiás on 1 December 2018, replacing departed Ney Franco. He was himself sacked the following 21 April, after losing the year's Campeonato Goiano.

América Mineiro
On 6 May 2019, Barbieri was announced as head coach of América Mineiro. On 15 July, after a 4–0 loss to Figueirense and only one win in seven matches, he was sacked.

CSA
Barbieri was appointed in charge of CSA on 10 December 2019, but was dismissed the following 10 February after only six matches in charge.

Red Bull Bragantino
On 2 September 2020, Barbieri took over Red Bull Bragantino in the top tier, replacing fired Felipe Conceição. After picking up the team in the 17th position, he managed to achieve a final 10th position in the season, qualifying to the 2021 Copa Sudamericana.

Barbieri reached the final of the Copa Sudamericana with Braga in 2021, but lost to Athletico Paranaense. On 10 November 2022, after a disappointing season overall, he was sacked.

Vasco da Gama
On 6 December 2022, Barbieri was named the new head coach of Vasco da Gama, also in the top tier.

Coaching statistics

References

External links

1981 births
Living people
Sportspeople from São Paulo
Brazilian football managers
Campeonato Brasileiro Série A managers
Campeonato Brasileiro Série B managers
Audax Rio de Janeiro Esporte Clube managers
Red Bull Brasil managers
Guarani FC managers
CR Flamengo managers
Goiás Esporte Clube managers
América Futebol Clube (MG) managers
Centro Sportivo Alagoano managers
Red Bull Bragantino managers
CR Vasco da Gama managers